"I Know" is a single recorded by American pop duo Aly & AJ. The follow-up to their previous single "Take Me", it was released on November 3, 2017 as the second single from their debut extended play, Ten Years (2017).

Composition 
"I Know" continues the electronic music experimentation found in their previous single "Take Me". It is a dance-pop, dream pop song that has a length of three minutes and thirty seconds. The song is in the key of F minor and moves at a tempo of 115 beats per minute in a 4/4 time signature. The song was musically compared to the works of M83.

The duo stated the song was inspired by the death of an acquaintance from cancer:

Critical reception 
Allison Stubblebine, writing for Billboard, praised the duo for "[learning] to hit the metaphorical nail on the head of pop, grasping the perfect balance of dreamy retro-vibes with powerful vocals."

Track listing 
Taken from Tidal.

Release history

References 

2017 singles
2017 songs
Indie pop songs
American synth-pop songs
Aly & AJ songs
Songs written by Aly Michalka
Songs written by AJ Michalka
Songs written by Jamie Sierota